Dimitry Laptev was a  cargo ship that was built in 1936 as Heinrich Schmidt by Flensburger Schiffbau-Gesellschaft, Flensburg, Germany for German owners. She was seized by the Allies in May 1945, passed to the Ministry of War Transport (MoWT) and was renamed Empire Constable. In 1946, she was transferred to the Soviet Government and renamed Dimitry Laptev. She served until she was scrapped in 1971.

Description
The ship was built in 1936 by Flensburger Schiffbau-Gesellschaft, Flensburg. The ship had a GRT of 1,560 and a NRT of 889.

The engine was built by Flensburger Schiffbau-Gesellschaft.

History
Heinrich Schmidt was built for Flensburger Schiffsparten-Vereinigung AG. She was operated under the management of H Schmidt GmbH. Her port of registry was Flensburg and the Code Letters DHKV were allocated.

Heinrich Schmidt was seized by the Allies in May 1945 at Flensburg. Ownership passed to the MoWT and she was renamed Empire Constable. Her port of registry was changed to London. The Code Letters GFWK and United Kingdom Official Number 180697 were allocated. She was operated under the management of the Shamrock Shipping Co Ltd. In February 1946, Empire Constable was transferred to the Soviet Union under the Potsdam Agreement. She was renamed Dimitry Laptev. She served until 1971, when she was scrapped.

References

1936 ships
Ships built in Flensburg
Steamships of Germany
Merchant ships of Germany
World War II merchant ships of Germany
Ministry of War Transport ships
Empire ships
Steamships of the United Kingdom
Merchant ships of the United Kingdom
Steamships of the Soviet Union
Merchant ships of the Soviet Union
Soviet Union–United Kingdom relations
Germany–Soviet Union relations